Abzu is the primeval sea below the void space of the underworld in ancient Mesopotamian belief.

Abzu, Abžu, or Abzû may also refer to:
 Abžu, a dialect of the Abkhaz language
 Abzû, a 2016 adventure video game
 Abzu (album), a 2011 album by Absu